Daniel Roberts (born 12 November 1975) is an English former footballer who played as a midfielder for Colchester United and a number of English non-league clubs.

Career

Born in Chelmsford, Roberts came through the youth ranks at Colchester United. He was brought into the first team early following a string of injuries and suspensions, meaning that manager George Burley needed to play him during two legs of a League Cup tie with Brentford. He came on as a substitute for Chris Fry to make his debut for the club in the first leg 2–0 home defeat on 16 August 1994, and made his second and final appearance in the return leg, starting at Griffin Park in another 2–0 defeat.

Roberts failed to feature in any further games for Colchester and he was not retained, later joining non-league clubs including Grays Athletic, Sudbury Town, Chelmsford City, Clacton Town, Harwich & Parkeston, Heybridge Swifts and Wivenhoe Town.

References

1975 births
Living people
Sportspeople from Chelmsford
English footballers
Association football midfielders
Colchester United F.C. players
Grays Athletic F.C. players
Sudbury Town F.C. players
Chelmsford City F.C. players
F.C. Clacton players
Harwich & Parkeston F.C. players
Heybridge Swifts F.C. players
Wivenhoe Town F.C. players